Admir "Ado" Šarčević (born May 14, 1967) is a retired Bosnian-Herzegovinian footballer.

Club career
Born in Sanski Most, SR Bosnia and Herzegovina, back then still within Yugoslavia, Šarčević played with FK Vojvodina and FK Borac Banja Luka in the Yugoslav First League.

Post-playing career
Currently he's living in Red Deer, Canada and is the Technical Director of the Red Deer Renegades soccer club. He also works as a travel agent.

Honours
Borac Banja Luka
Mitropa Cup: 1992

References

External sources
 playerhistory.com
 Interview on Borac B.Luka official website. 

1967 births
Living people
People from Sanski Most
Association football midfielders
Yugoslav footballers
Bosnia and Herzegovina footballers
FK Vojvodina players
FK Borac Banja Luka players
FK Novi Pazar players
Yugoslav First League players
Bosnia and Herzegovina expatriate footballers
Expatriate men's footballers in Denmark
Bosnia and Herzegovina expatriate sportspeople in Denmark
Expatriate soccer players in Canada
Bosnia and Herzegovina expatriate sportspeople in Canada